Tanya Ekanayaka (born 6 May 1977) is a Sri Lankan-British contemporary virtuoso composer-pianist, classically trained and with a background in Asian and World music as well as a record producer, musicologist and linguist.

Early life 
She began studying the piano at the age of five, and at the age of 12 made her debut recital. At the age of 16, as youngest competitor and joint winner of the biennial concerto competition of the Symphony Orchestra of Sri Lanka, she performed her first concerto.

Career

Ekanayaka's debut album of compositions for solo piano composed, performed and produced by her, Reinventions: Rhapsodies for Piano, came out in 2015. Each work in the album builds upon a motif inspired by the tonality of the works which preceded it in its primary concert performance and adaptations of melodies belonging to genres of Sri Lankan traditional and folk music.

Twelve Piano Prisms, her second solo album of works for the piano, was released on 14 September 2018.

Ekanayaka's debut album contains adaptations of 10 of the 18 Sri Lankan Vannams while her second album contains adaptations of the remaining 8 Vannams along with adaptations of indigenous and traditional melodies of Armenia, China, Japan, the United Kingdom and the United States of America.

The Planets & Humanity - Piano Reflections, her third solo album of works for the piano, was released on 14 May 2021.

The works in this album correspond to reflections on the eight planets of earth’s solar system and earth’s seven continents and most contain trans-creations of melodies of indigenous peoples of Africa, Asia, Australia/Oceania, Europe, North America and South America, specifically, melodies of the Asháninka, Cree, Gond, Hadza, Numbulwar and Sámi people.

Ekanayaka is the first Sri Lankan composer, in history, to have complete albums of original music released worldwide by an international record label.

She also developed a music composition project from 2012 to 2014. The project aimed to assist war-affected and impoverished Sri Lankan school children recovering from the country's thirty year civil war.

Ekanayaka holds a Bachelor of Arts (Honours) degree from the University of Peradeniya and a Master of Science degree and PhD from the University of Edinburgh. She is a Fellow (FTCL) of the Trinity College of Music (UK), a Licentiate (LRSM) of the Royal Schools of Music (UK) and Licentiate (LGSMD) of the Guildhall School of Music & Drama (UK) which awarded her its Professional Performer's Diploma (PPD) in 1999.

She is ambidextrous and has a synaesthesia, which influences her style of composition.

Key works
Adahas: Of Wings Of Roots (2010), for piano
Dhaivaya: Altering Hue (2011), for piano
Labyrinth; Vannam Lent (2012), for piano
Dew Encounters: Of Scottish Walks, Vannam (Udara) & Sri Lanka's Bugs Bunny (2013), for piano
Vannam (Gajaga, Mayura & Hanuma) & You (2013), for piano
In Lotus: Olu Pipila With Moment (2013), for piano
2013/14 June Echoes (2013–14), for piano
G – With Paaru Kavi (2016), for piano
F – Renewal & Goyam Kapuma (2016), for piano 
F Sharp – Kitty & Bambaru (2016), for piano
E Flat – July 2016/17 (2016–17), for piano
B Flat – Armenia to a Pearl (2017), for piano
C – Emerald Lapwing Karpet (2017), for piano
D Flat – Intuition, Auld Lang Syne & an Asian Sacred (2017), for piano
E – Arrow-and (2017), for piano
A – Zuni Sea (2017), for piano
A Flat Scintilla: Komitas Unto Childhood (2017), for piano
B – Of Vannam & Zhuang Tai Qiu Si (2017), for piano
D – Hana Hare (2017), for piano
Neptune: Asháninka Kindled (2018 & 2020), for piano
Mercury with Antarctica (2019–20), for piano
Uranus: Numbulwar Sustaining (2020), for piano
Venus: Sámi Traced (2019–20), for piano
Saturn: Gond Inspired (2019), for piano
Earth – Life (2020), for piano
Jupiter: Cree Cast (2020), for piano
Mars: Hadzabe Touched (2020), for piano

References

External links

Living people
1977 births
British record producers
21st-century classical composers
21st-century composers
British classical composers
British classical pianists
Sinhalese musicians
Sri Lankan composers
Sri Lankan pianists
Women in classical music
Composers for piano
21st-century classical pianists
British women record producers
21st-century women composers
21st-century women pianists